More may refer to:

Computing
 MORE (application), outline software for Mac OS
 more (command), a shell command
 MORE protocol, a routing protocol
 Missouri Research and Education Network

Music

Albums
 More! (album), by Booka Shade, 2010
 More (soundtrack), by Pink Floyd with music from the 1969 film
 More... (Trace Adkins album), or the title song, 1999
 More (Mary Alessi album), 2005
 More (Beyoncé EP), 2014
 More (Michael Bublé EP), 2005
 More (Clarke-Boland Big Band album), 1968
 More (Double Dagger album), 2009
 More... (Montell Jordan album), 1996
 More (Crystal Lewis album), 2001
 More (Giuseppi Logan album), 1966
 More (No Trend album), 2001
 More (Jeremy Riddle album), or the title song, 2017
 More (Symphony Number One album), 2016
 More (Tamia album), or the title song, 2004
 More (Vitamin C album), 2001
 More, by Mylon LeFevre, 1983
 More, by Resin Dogs, 2007

Songs
 "More" (Alex Alstone and Tom Glazer song), popularized by Perry Como, 1956
 "More" (Alison Moyet song), 2003
 "More" (K/DA song), 2020
 "More" (Matthew West song), 2003
 "More" (Peaches song), 2009
 "More" (The Sisters of Mercy song), 1990
 "More" (Trace Adkins song), 2000
 "More" (Usher song), 2010
 "More" (Theme from Mondo Cane), from the 1963 film Mondo Cane
 "More", by 5 Seconds of Summer from Youngblood, 2018
 "More", by the Black Eyed Peas, performed on the Black Blue & You Tour, 2007
 "More", by Doctor and the Medics from I Keep Thinking It's Tuesday, 1987
 "More", by Grupa More, featuring Meri Cetinić, 1973
 "More", by Halsey from Manic, 2020
 "More", by Ice Prince from Fire of Zamani, 2012
 "More", by J-Hope from Jack in the Box, 2022
 "More", by Junkie XL from More More, 2007
 "More", by Madonna from I'm Breathless, 1990
 "More", by Selena Gomez & the Scene from Kiss & Tell, 2009

Bands
 More (British band), a 1980s heavy metal band
 More, a 1980s Yugoslav band featuring Doris Dragović

Places
 More, Shropshire, a location in the United Kingdom
 Möre, one of the original small lands of historical province Småland in southern Sweden

Radio, film, and television
 More (1969 film), a film directed by Barbet Schroeder
 More (1998 film), a short film by Mark Osborne
 More (2017 film), a Turkish drama film
 More FM, a New Zealand radio network
 More Radio, an FM station in Swindon, North Wiltshire, UK
 "More", an episode of The Good Doctor

Other uses
 more, an English comparative determiner
 More (surname), a family name, including a list of people with the surname
 More!, a British women's fashion magazine
 More (magazine), an American women's lifestyle magazine
 More (cigarette), a cigarette brand marketed to women
 More (store), a chain of supermarkets in India
 Morè (clan), a Maratha clan of India
 More (interjection), used in many Balkan languages
 Mòoré language or Moré, a language spoken primarily in Burkina Faso by the Mossi
morebus, a bus brand operating around Bournemouth and Poole (England, UK)
 Mayors Organized for Reparations and Equity (MORE), a coalition of U.S. mayors committed to paying reparations to African American citizens of their cities

See also
 Møre (disambiguation), name of districts in Scandinavia
 More, More, More (disambiguation)
 
 
 Moar (disambiguation)
 Mohr (disambiguation)
 Moor (disambiguation)
 Moore (disambiguation)
 Mores
 Moores (disambiguation)
 MOR (disambiguation)